The Russian 11th Army was a World War I Russian field army that fought on the Eastern theatre of war.

Field management was established in October 1914. The unit fought on the Southwestern Front during the entire war.

Commanders
 21.10.1914 – 05.04.1915 — General of Infantry Andrey Selivanov
 05.04.1915 – 19.10.1915 — General of Infantry Dmitry Shcherbachev
 19.10. 1915 – 25.10.1916 — General of Infantry Vladimir Viktorovich Sakharov 
 25.10.1916 – 20.12.1916 — General of Infantry Vladislav Klembovsky
 20.12.1916 – 05.04.1917 — General of Infantry Dimitri Bałanin
 15.04.1917 – 21.05.1917 — Lieutenant-General Aleksei Gutor
 25.05.1917 – 04.06.1917 — General of Infantry Ivan Fiedotov
 04.06.1917 – 09.07.1917 — General of Cavalry Ivan Erdélyi
 29.04.1917 – 09.09.1917 — General of Infantry Pyotr Baluyev
 19.07.1917 – 29.08.1917 — Lieutenant-General Fiodor Rerberg
 09.09.1917 – 01.12.1917 — Lieutenant-General Mikhail Promtov

See also
 List of Russian armies in World War I
 List of Imperial Russian Army formations and units

References

Armies of the Russian Empire
Military units and formations established in 1914
1914 establishments in the Russian Empire
Military units and formations disestablished in 1917